Taiyuan Coal Gasification (Group) Co., Ltd. is a Chinese state-owned coal mining conglomerate based in Taiyuan, Shanxi. However, Shanxi SASAC granted fellow state-owned enterprise Jincheng Anthracite Mining Group (JAMG) to manage their stake since 2011.

Taiyuan Coal Gasification Group was the largest shareholder of Taiyuan Coal Gasification Co., Ltd. (TCGC) for 49.45% stake until 2016. A backdoor listing was planned for a subsidiary of JAMG, which produces coal mine methane. The assets and liabilities of the listed company before 31 January 2016 would sold back to Taiyuan Coal Gasification Group.

In 2005 Taiyuan Coal Gasification Group was in the enterprise list in line with Coking Industry Access Condition (first batch) of the National Development and Reform Commission. According to a publication of the National Energy Administration, Taiyuan Coal Gasification Group had a coal mining capability of 6.25 million tons per year in 2015 (5.80 million tons for the listed company), despite the list was incomplete (number 156 to 163 mine of the list, except 159). The listed company had produced coal of 4.38 million tons in 2015, including raw coal, middling coal and refined coal.

According to Dagong Global Credit Rating, the group sold natural gas to citizen below the cost the group bought from other companies in 2015. The group was the natural gas and coal gas provider for Taiyuan (excluding Gujiao), Jinzhong and Linfen.

History

Taiyuan Coal Gasification Group
Taiyuan Coal Gasification Corporation was incorporated in 1981. In 1998 it was re-incorporated as a limited company as Taiyuan Coal Gasification (Group) Co., Ltd. under the new Company Law of China, with China Cinda Asset Management and China Huarong Asset Management became minority shareholders due to debt-to-equity swap. A subsidiary Taiyuan Coal Gasification Co., Ltd. was also incorporated on 22 December 1998, receiving a coal mine in Jialequan, Gujiao, a coal preparation plant in the Wanbailin District, Taiyuan and a coking factory from the parent company, and became a publicly traded company (on Shenzhen Stock Exchange) in 2000. Taiyuan Coal Gasification Group retained an old coal gas factory and a coal mine which produces low grade thermal coal with sulfur content >2% at that time. The group later sold several more assets to the public company. Although the group also bought back the coking factories in 2013 as they were forced to close down by the urban renewal of Taiyuan in 2012.

After a heavy net loss in 2015, all of the assets and liabilities of the listed company (mostly coal mines and other equity investments) would be sold back to the parent company in 2016, in order to allow Jincheng Anthracite Mining Group to backdoor listing a subsidiary in the stock exchange.

Taiyuan Coal Gasification Company
Taiyuan Coal Gasification Co., Ltd. was incorporated on 22 December 1998 as Shanxi Shenzhou Coal Electricity Coking Co., Ltd., which produces coal and coke at that time. The deal was renewed for a year in 2006. The listed company also acquired coal preparation plants in Lishi and Donghe from the parent company in 2006 (for ) and 2007 (for ).

In August 2012, the coal gangue thermal power station and the number 2 coking factory of the listed company were closed down due to urban renewal policy of Taiyuan. The number 1 coking factory had closed down in April 2012.

As at 31 December 2015, despite the listed company retained the name "coal gasification", the listed company only produce coal as their product, which sold coal to Benxi Steel Group, Shandong Iron and Steel Company, Tangshan Yanshan Iron and Steel , as well as sold to sister company Shanxi Shenlong Energy Coking as their top 4 customers (36.34% of the sales volume).

In 2016, a plan to sell all of the assets and liabilities at 31 January 2016 of the listed company to Taiyuan Coal Gasification Group was announced. At the same time the shell company would be used as a backdoor listing of a subsidiary of Jincheng Anthracite Mining Group (JAMG). JAMG already acquired 24.26% stake of the listed company from Taiyuan Coal Gasification Group before the finalization of the backdoor listing.

In April 2017 the backdoor listing and recapitalization was completed. JAMG became the largest shareholder for 40.05% shares. It was followed by the Taiyuan Coal Gasification Group for 13.38% and China Cinda Asset Management for 7.02%.

Subsidiaries

 Taiyuan Natural Gas (97.25%)
 two coal mines in Qinghe, Gujiao (60%)
 Shanxi Shenlong Energy Coking Co., Ltd. (100%)
 Taiyuan Coal Gasification Group Real Estate Development (100%)

Shareholders
In 2008 China National Coal Group (China Coal Group) was the largest shareholder of Taiyuan Coal Gasification Group. China Coal Group excluded Taiyuan Coal Gasification Group from injecting to listed company China Coal Energy due to Taiyuan Coal Gasification Group has provide coal gas to citizen in not-for-profit basis, as well as half the stake was held by other state-owned enterprise.

 State Council of the People's Republic of China
 via SASAC
 via wholly owned subsidiary China National Coal Group (35.39%)
 via the Ministry of Finance
 via subsidiary China Cinda Asset Management (11.15%)
 via subsidiary China Huarong Asset Management (2.46%)

Financial data

Note: Net profit and equity were excluding minority interests

References

External links

 
 Official website of Taiyuan Coal Gasification Company

Coal companies of China
Chemical companies of China
Electric power companies of China
Natural gas companies of China
Companies owned by the provincial government of China
Government-owned companies of China
Manufacturing companies established in 1981
Energy companies established in 1981
Non-renewable resource companies established in 1981
Chinese companies established in 1981
Companies based in Taiyuan